Vinagarra elongata is a species of ray-finned fish in the genus Vinagarra.

References

Vinagarra
Fish described in 2010